Miss America is an annual competition open to women.

Miss America may also refer to:

Characters
 Miss America (DC Comics), a Quality Comics and later DC Comics character
 Miss America (Marvel Comics), a list of Marvel Comics characters named Miss America
 Miss America (Madeline Joyce), a Marvel Comics character
 Miss America (America Chavez), a Marvel Comics character
 Miss America, a member of the Battle Fever J Super Sentai Series
 Miss America, a character in Coonskin

Music
 Chocolate USA or Miss America, a US rock band
 Miss America (Mary Margaret O'Hara album) (1988)
 Miss America (Saving Abel album) (2010)
 Miss America (book), the second autobiography of American radio and media personality Howard Stern
 "Miss America" (Styx song) (1977)
 "Miss America" (J. Cole song), 2012
 "Miss America" (Måns Zelmerlöw song), 2008
 "Miss America" (Saving Abel song), 2010
 "Miss America" (The Big Dish song), 1990
"Miss America", a 1970 song by Mark Lindsay
 "Miss America", a 1997 song by David Byrne from Feelings

Other uses
 Miss America (film), a 2002 documentary film
 Miss America (speedboats), a line of speedboats raced by Garfield Wood
 Miss America, a title awarded in 1919 to Edith Hyde Robbins Macartney (preceding the modern title competition by a year)
 Miss America, a pseudonym of the winning female of the first Paris–Rouen cycle race

See also

 Miss Teen America, a beauty contest for teenage girls
 Miss United States, a beauty contest that has been held annually since 1937
 Miss USA, a beauty contest that has been held annually since 1952
 Mrs. America (contest), a beauty contest for married American women
 
 
 America (disambiguation)
 Miss Columbia (disambiguation), "Columbia" is the feminine form of the masculine term "America"